Wil Collins (born August 24, 1978) is an American professional golfer who has played on the PGA Tour.

Career
Collins was born in Rapid City, South Dakota. He played college golf at the University of New Mexico from  1998–2002, where he played with fellow PGA Tour professional Michael Letzig and won the 2001 Ben Hogan Award.

He turned professional in 2002. He won the 2005 Colorado Open by six strokes. Major appearances include 2005 and 2013 U.S. Open, where he missed the cut both times.

Collins made a 20-foot par putt at the last hole of 2008 Q-School to win his 2009 PGA Tour card. He later said of it: "I finally have a home to play, and it's on the greatest tour in the world. It's going to take a while to sink in."

After Collins was unable to retain status in the United States, he took his game to PGA Tour Canada, where he won the 2013 Dakota Dunes Casino Open.  Collins finished the season 5th on the PGA Tour Canada Order of Merit earning a spot on the 2014 Web.com Tour.

Professional wins (6)

PGA Tour Canada wins (1)

Other wins (5)
2005 Colorado Open
2010 Idaho Open
2012 New Mexico Open, Nebraska Open
2022 Colorado Open

See also
2008 PGA Tour Qualifying School graduates

References

External links

American male golfers
New Mexico Lobos men's golfers
PGA Tour golfers
Golfers from South Dakota
Sportspeople from Rapid City, South Dakota
Golfers from Albuquerque, New Mexico
1978 births
Living people